The Reincarnation of a Surfboard is a body of sculpture work created by Ithaka Darin Pappas (contemporary artist, musician, photographer, writer and surfer). The project, which began in 1989 consist of approximately 300 wall-mounted sculptures that have been made using recycled surfboards as raw building material. The series to date has been exhibited on four continents (Asia, Europe, North America, South America). The most recent solo exhibitions of these works were mesa hosted by WOA - Way Of Arts in Cascais, Portugal in December 2012, by Hurley International in Costa Mesa, California in October 2013 and F+ Gallery in Santa Ana in February 2015.

In December 2012 during an interview piece regarding his solo showing of surfboard sculptures at Gallery WOA in Lisbon,  Fuel TV Europe (a popular action sports channel) declared Ithaka Darin Pappas as "The Godfather of Contemporary Surf Art".

Solo exhibitions

 2015 F+ Gallery - Santa Ana, California (Sculptures, Photographs, Paintings)
 2013 Hurley International - Costa Mesa, California (Sculptures, Photographs, Paintings)
 2012 WOA - Way Of Arts (Sculpture, Video & Photography) curated by Gonçalo Leandro- Cascais, Portugal
 2011 Nike Posto 5.0 - Rio de Janeiro, Brazil
 2010 The Camp - Costa Mesa, California
 2010 Gallery Alma Do Mar - São Paulo, Brazil
 2008 Clash - Lisbon, Portugal
 2007 WOA - Way Of Arts - Estoril, Portugal curated by Gonçalo Leandro
 2000 International Surfing Museum - Huntington Beach, California
.
 1995 Universidade Moderna - Lisbon, Portugal
 1992 Gallery YMA -(Photography and Sculpture) Tokyo, Japan
 1990 Pepperdine University - Los Angeles, California

Group exhibitions
 2016 Surfboards On Parade - Huntington Beach, California
 2014 Surfboards On Parade - Huntington Beach, California
 2013 Sagres Surf Culture - Sagres, Portugal
 2010 Oca Do Ibirapuera - São Paulo, Brazil
 2007 Oca Do Ibirapuera - São Paulo, Brazil
 2006 MIS - São Paulo Museum of Image and Sound, Brazil
 2005 MIS - São Paulo Museum of Image and Sound, Brazil
 2003 Gallery Minna 111 - San Francisco, California
 1992 NICAF: Nippon International Contemporary Art Fair - Yokohama, Japan
 1990 01 Gallery Los Angeles

Book appearances
 2009 "Surf Story" compiled by Robb Havassy
 2004  Belong: A TV Journalist's Search for Urban Culture – by Jennifer Morton (Canada)
2000 The End of Print by David Carson (graphic designer) (United States)

Documentary
 2006 On the Road to Ithaka - A documentary about the artist Ithaka Darin Pappas directed by Susanna Lira. Winner of the Best Script Award at the FATU Film Festival, São Paulo Brazil

TV features
 2012 Action Sport Plus – Fuel TV
 2012 Zoomed In – Sport TV
 2012 Curto Circuito – SIC Radical

Magazine, newspaper, and web features
 2013 The Orange County Register - "Broken Boards Given New Life As Art" by Laylan Connelly
 2013 Jornal I - "Ithaka Is Also Mad" by Beatriz Silva (May 4, 2013)
 2012 Surf Portugal Magazine - "Pranchas Renascidas" by Susana Santos
 2012 Onfire Magazine (Portugal)
 2012 Visão Magazine (Portugal) "Pranchas De Surf Reencarnadas Como Art" by João Paulo Vieira
 2012 Fluir Magazine (Brazil) "Miscelania" by Alessandro de Toni
 2010 The Huffington Post - "Surf's Up And Get Creative!" by Lauren Selman

References

1989 sculptures
Folk art
American folk art
Contemporary works of art
American contemporary art
Surf culture
Ithaka Darin Pappas